"Don't Wanna Let You Go" is a song by British boy band Five. Written by producers Richard Stannard and Julian Gallagher with band members Abs Breen, and Jason "J" Brown, and Sean Conlon, the song was released on 6 March 2000 as the fourth single from Five's second studio album, Invincible (1999).

The song charted at number nine on the UK Singles Chart and also peaked at number five in New Zealand. The music video for the song was directed by Cameron Casey—who also directed the videos for "If Ya Gettin' Down" and "Keep On Movin'"—and produced by Andy Leahy and Richard Fenton.

Chart performance
The song debuted at number nine on the UK Singles Chart on 18 March 2000. It also peaked at number five in New Zealand.

Music video
The music video for the song was directed by Cameron Casey—who also directed the videos for "If Ya Gettin' Down" and "Keep On Movin'"—and produced by Andy Leahy and Richard Fenton. The video was acted similarly to the 1999 movie The Matrix.

The video begins with binary code on a computer screen. A computerised voice says "OK, I'm in. Five, you're mine." Three members of the band, Ritchie Neville, Sean Conlon and Abs Breen, si in a room and they look at a laptop when Scott Robinson comes in and says "Lads? The freak is officially...back.", and dumps a big pile of fanmail on the table. An obsessive female fan appears to have been constantly sending Five emails and letters in the hope of meeting them, so they decide to go to the girl's address in their Range Rover. The pull up at a mansion and they look round. Jason "J" Brown touches a large graphic and gets sucked into the girl's computer. While the girl is on the sciencity, she watches the faces of each member of the band. The sparks come through, and she gasps when she tries to escape. Several minutes later, she runs down the stairs, enters a different office and discovers Sean's head inside a refrigerator and she screams in terror. When Five dance in the hallway, she runs back into the same office and answers the telephone and there's no one calling. The sparks and electricity crashes on the computer and she runs out while screaming. Five talk when she is trapped in the mansion, then Neville says, "Let's Get J Back". The members turn invisible and she closes her eyes and screams again. Following that, J reemerges, then goes on to rejoin the rest of the band. The members dance and the Five logo comes up. At the final scene, the lightning struck the mansion and she runs away while screaming and it fades to black, her intense scream can be heard at the end.

According to Brown, he got a severe mental breakdown during the production of the video after frequent insomnia.

Track listings
UK and Australian CD1
 "Don't Wanna Let You Go" (radio edit) – 3:38
 "Don't Wanna Let You Go" (Biffco extended mix) – 4:41
 "Interview Request Line"

UK and Australian CD2
 "Don't Wanna Let You Go" (radio edit)
 "Battlestar"
 Enhanced CD

UK cassette single and European CD single
 "Don't Wanna Let You Go" (radio edit)
 "Battlestar"

Credits and personnel
Credits are lifted from the UK CD1 liner notes and the Invincible album booklet.

Studio
 Recorded at Windmill Lane Studios (Dublin, Ireland)

Personnel

 Richard Stannard – writing, production
 Julian Gallagher – writing, production
 Abs Breen – writing (as Richard Breen)
 Jason "J" Brown – writing
 Sean Conlon – writing
 Mikkel Eriksen – all instruments
 Hallgeir Rustan – all instruments
 Tor Erik Hermansen – all instruments
 Adrian Bushby – recording, mixing
 Alvin Sweeney – recording assistant
 Jake Davies – Pro Tools
 StarGate – remix and additional production

Charts

Weekly charts

Year-end chart

References

1999 songs
2000 singles
Bertelsmann Music Group singles
Five (band) songs
RCA Records singles
Song recordings produced by Richard Stannard (songwriter)
Song recordings produced by Stargate (record producers)
Songs written by Abz Love
Songs written by Jason "J" Brown
Songs written by Julian Gallagher
Songs written by Richard Stannard (songwriter)
Songs written by Sean Conlon